Kay's Cross was a large stone cross (roughly  high by  wide) located at the base of a hollow in northeastern Kaysville, Utah, United States. Its origins are disputed, and several urban legends are tied to the site. The cross was demolished with explosives by unknown persons in 1992.

Origin
One account of the origin of the cross states it was built in 1946 by locals influenced by Krishna Venta, a religious leader in the 1940s and 50s, who claimed to be the Second Coming of Christ and led a small sect based out of Simi Valley, California. The cross was built by a man named Kingston in honor of Krishna Venta.

Demolition

On 15 February 1992, the cross was destroyed by an explosion; police made no immediate arrests.

In 2013, a "haunted" tour of Kay's Cross and the surrounding forest was started, stirring interest again in the decades-old legend.

References

 Lakeside Review, 1981
 Ogden Standard Examiner, 1992

External links
 Kay's Cross, Utah Gothic
 "The Mystery of Kays Cross", Box 22: 94-11, Graduate Student Fieldwork, Folk Collection 8, Fife Folklore Archives, Utah State University
 "Legends and Folklore of Kaysville's Mysterious Stone Cross", Box 38: 91-13, Conference Student Fieldwork, Folk Collection 8, Fife Folklore Archives, Utah State University
 "The Mysterious Kay's Cross", Project 610, William A. Wilson Folklore Archives, L. Tom Perry Special Collections, Harold B. Lee Library, Brigham Young University
 Kay's Cross and Other Kaysville Mysteries, local history blog
 "KSL report on Kay's Cross" KSL Channel 5 News
 "The Strange, Awful Truth Behind Utah’s Eerie Stone Cross" Atlas Obscura
 Kay's Cross. Slug Magazine, September 29, 2016
 Mysterious Kaysville cross opens to the public. Fox 13, Sept 13, 2013

Vandalized works of art in Utah
Monumental crosses in the United States
Destroyed sculptures
Urban legends
Utah culture
Buildings and structures in Davis County, Utah